John Hussey (c. 1520 – c. 1572), of Cuckfield, Sussex, was an English politician.

He was a Member (MP) of the Parliament of England for New Shoreham in 1559 and for Horsham in 1571.

References

1520 births
1572 deaths
People from Cuckfield
English MPs 1559
English MPs 1571